Leonardo Álvarez Romo (born 7 October 1972) is a Mexican politician affiliated with the Ecologist Green Party of Mexico. Former Mexican congressman in two occasions, he started his political career in 1994 at the campaign of the presidential candidate Luis Donaldo Colosio Murrieta, along with the actual Mexican Senator, Armando Ríos Peter. After the assassination of Colosio, he worked in the environmental NGO that he founded and called CAMBIOS (Changes) and continued his studies in Political Sciences and Public Administration. Later on, he was the personal assistance of the famous politician Manuel Camacho Solis, in the Center Democratic Party from 1997 to 2000. Then in November 2000 he affiliate to the Green Party of Mexico. From 2000 to 2003 he was the political adviser of the green legislators in the Mexican Senate, and then adviser of the President of the Green party of Mexico. Later on, he was postulated by his Party as Deputy of the LIX Legislature of the Mexican Congress as a plurinominal representative from 2003 to 2006. There as a congressman, he was President of the Special Commission for the Reform of the State, member of the Commissions of National Defense, Indigenous Affairs, Environmental Affairs, and Fishing Affairs. He reformed the Environmental Law to make the Army and the Navy of Mexico participate in the protection of the environment, also he left a profound study of the necessities of a Political Reform for Mexico. Then, from 2006 to 2009, he was Deputy of the House of Representatives of Mexico City. There he was Leader of the Greens, President of the Commission of Environmental Affairs, and in several occasions Chairman and Vice-chairman of the House of Representatives of Mexico City. He reformed the Law to create the Environmental Police, to prohibit the use of plastic bags in supermarkets and stores, and to create the Forest Firefighters. From 2004 to 2012 he was the Secretary of Foreign Affairs of the Green Party of Mexico. He was elected in Santiago, Chile, President of the Federation of Green Parties in the Americas for the term 2009–2011. At the moment he works in the Federal Government, at the Ministry of Environment and Natural Resources, with the position of General Director in matters of Indigenous, Legislative and NGO's Affairs.

References

1972 births
Living people
Politicians from Mexico City
Members of the Chamber of Deputies (Mexico)
Ecologist Green Party of Mexico politicians
Deputies of the LIX Legislature of Mexico